Kitty Wentzel (née Bætzmann; 9 August 1868 – 20 November 1961) was a Norwegian writer and journalist. She was born in Christiania, and was the daughter of the journalist Frederik Bætzmann and the actress Karen Marie Fougner. She was married to painter Gustav Wentzel. She was a journalist for the newspaper Verdens Gang from 1913 to 1917, and for Ørebladet from 1917 to 1924.

Among her books are Bordets glæder from 1925, written jointly with Øvre Richter Frich, the biography Gustav Wentzel from 1956, and the memoirs Fra mitt livs karusell from 1960.

References

1868 births
1961 deaths
Writers from Oslo
Norwegian journalists
Norwegian biographers
Norwegian food writers
Norwegian women non-fiction writers
Norwegian memoirists
Women memoirists
Women biographers